Afro-Syrians are Syrian people of Black African heritage. They almost entirely live in Southwestern Daraa and the bordering Golan Heights with only a handful living in other parts of Syria and other parts of the world. Outside of Daraa, their existence is nearly unknown.

History
There are many different origins of Afro-Syrians, the most common ones are the Arab slave trade, African Muslims settling in Syria during the Islamic Golden Age, African refugees that received Syrian citizenship, Syrian refugees in Africa who mixed with the local Africans, Syrian refugees in Brazil who mixed with Afro-Brazilians, and interracial marriages between Syrians and black people. Sudan is listed as the most common place of ancestry for Afro-Syrians, with Sudan and Syria having connections since the spread of Islam and the rapidly-growing number of Syrian refugees in Sudan and Sudanese refugees in Syria. Most Afro-Syrians fell under ISIS rule during the Syrian Civil War. A community of Shia Afro-Syrians exists in Damascus. A lot of Afro-Palestinians also reside in refugee camps in Syria.

Social condition
The existence of Afro-Syrians is very little known in Daraa, and basically unknown in other parts of Syria. Afro-Syrians are highly concentrated in southwestern Daraa. They are the smallest Afro-Arab group. On top of war and occupation, Afro-Syrians experience severe racism and discrimination, including not being given any representation at all. Their population is unknown and has never been recorded.

See also
 Syria
 Syrians
 Arabs
 Afro-Arabs
 Afro-Palestinians
 Afro-Jordanians
 Afro-Saudis
 Afro-Iraqis

References

Ethnic groups in Syria
African diaspora in the Middle East
African diaspora in Asia